County Road 181 is a two-lane highway in Viken and Innlandet counties in Norway. The road runs between the village of Boksrud in Eidsvoll municipality (in Viken) and the village of Sagstua in Nord-Odal municipality (in Innlandet).

Prior to 1 January 2010, the road was classified as a national road and it was called National Road 181. On that date, it was reclassified to a county road. This was part of a transfer of most national roads in Norway from the responsibility of the national government to the local county municipalities.

References

Roads in Viken
Roads in Innlandet
Roads in Eidsvoll
Roads in Nord-Odal
Former Norwegian national roads
181